Dana W. Gonzales (born November 18, 1963) is an American director and cinematographer from Los Angeles, California.

Career
Dana is a member of the American Society of Cinematographers, the Academy of Motion Picture and Sciences, and the Television Academy.

A regular cinematographer on Fargo, he won the Primetime Emmy Award for Outstanding Cinematography for a Limited Series or Movie for the episode "Waiting for Dutch".

Filmography
Feature films
 Man in the Chair (2007)
 Felon (2008)
 Down for Life (2009)
 Empire State (2013)
 Snitch (2013)
 Criminal (2016)
 Incarnate (2016)
 Shot Caller (2017)
 Greenland (2020)
 The Toxic Avenger (2023)
 Centurion (2023) [director]

Television series
 Pretty Little Liars (2010-2012) [also director]
 Southland (2010-2013)
 Longmire (2013-2016)
 Fargo (2014-2020) [also director]
 Legion (2017-2019) [also director]
 Chambers (2019) [also director]
 Hanna (2019)
 The Handmaids Tale (2022) [director]
 The Changeling (2023) [director]

Awards
 2014 - Primetime Emmy Awards -Nominated, Primetime Emmy - Outstanding Cinematography for a Miniseries or Movie for Fargo (2014) -FX Network -For episode: "Buridan's Ass".
 2016 - 68th Primetime Emmy Awards - Primetime Emmy Award for Outstanding Cinematography for a Limited Series or Movie (Fargo)
 2017 - Camerimage -Nominated, Jury Award -Best Pilot for Legion (2017)
 2017 - Primetime Emmy Awards -Nominated, Primetime Emmy - Outstanding Cinematography for a Limited Series or Movie for Fargo (2014)Episode: "The Law Of Vacant Places"
 2018 - Primetime Emmy Awards - Nominated, Primetime Emmy - Outstanding Cinematography for a Single Camera Series (One-Hour) “Legion”(2018)For episode "Chapter 9"
 2018 - American Society of Cinematographers, USA - Nominated, ASC Award - Outstanding Achievement in Cinematography in Episode of a Series for Commercial Television for Legion (2017)  Episode: "Chapter 1"
 2019  Primetime Emmy Awards - Hanna  “Forrest” - OUTSTANDING CINEMATOGRAPHY FOR A SINGLE CAMERA SERIES (One Hour) -  Nominee 
 2020  ASC Awards - Legion  “Chapter 20”    Episode of a Series for Commercial Television - Nominee
 2021  Primetime Emmy Awards - Fargo  “East/West” OUTSTANDING CINEMATOGRAPHY FOR A LIMITED SERIES OR MOVIE -  Nominee 
 2021  British Society of Cinematographers  - Fargo  “East/West” -  Best Cinematography in a Television Drama  Award  - Nominee

References

External links
 
 

1963 births
Living people
American cinematographers
Artists from Los Angeles
Primetime Emmy Award winners